Rasheed Hazzard (born August 5, 1976) is an American basketball coach. He is the current head coach of the Cape Town Tigers of the Basketball Africa League (BAL). Hazzard is the son of Walt Hazzard who played for the Los Angeles Lakers. He played collegiately for George Washington University.

Career 
Hazzard started his coaching career as head coach of Venice High School in Los Angeles, staying there for five years. He then joined the college team Portland Pilots as assistant coach. 

In 2006, he entered the Los Angeles Lakers organisation where he had different roles over the next five seasons. He was a part-time scout for the Lakers, while also being an assistant for the NBA D-League's Los Angeles D-Fenders part-time.

In 2014, Razzard joined the New York Knicks as an assistant coach, where he would stay for three seasons.

On January 19, 2020, Razzed was announced as the associate head coach for Veltex Shizuoka of the Japanese B.League.

Following his return to the United States, Razzard joined the NBA G League Ignite team as assistant.

In January 2023, the South African club Cape Town Tigers announced Hazzard as their new head coach.

References

External links
New York Knicks bio

1976 births
Living people
American basketball scouts
American men's basketball coaches
American men's basketball players
George Washington Colonials men's basketball players
High school basketball coaches in California
Los Angeles D-Fenders coaches
Los Angeles Lakers scouts
NBA G League Ignite coaches
New York Knicks assistant coaches
Portland Pilots men's basketball coaches
Veltex Shizuoka coaches
Venice High School (Los Angeles) alumni